Seresh Badaran (also Romanized as Seresh Bāderān and Sereshbādarān; also known as Darān, Seresh Bāzerūn, Sereshk Bādarān, Sorūsh, and Sorūsh Bādarān) is a village in Jey Rural District, in the Central District of Isfahan County, Isfahan Province, Iran. At the 2006 census, its population was 2,101, in 602 families.

References 

Populated places in Isfahan County